

Legend

List

References

1992-93